The Fredericton Express were a professional ice hockey team based in Fredericton, New Brunswick, Canada. They played in the American Hockey League between 1981 and 1988. The Express were affiliated with the Quebec Nordiques and Vancouver Canucks of the National Hockey League. Home games were played at the Aitken Centre on the University of New Brunswick campus.

After the Canucks hired Brian Burke as Vice President and Director of Hockey Operations in 1987, tensions between the joint ownership by the two teams were beginning to show  Burke visited Fredericton for the first time in October of that year. The previous season the Express had the 2nd worst record in the AHL and the team’s top five scorers were all sent down by the Canucks.

Despite the internal conflict,in 1988 the Express played their best season yet, with a 42-21 Win-Loss record. The Express went on to play in the Calder Cup Finals, where they lost to the Hershey Bears, with a final score of 4-2. During the summer of that year, they moved to become the Halifax Citadels.

Season-by-season results

Regular season

Playoffs

See also
List of ice hockey teams in New Brunswick

References 

Quebec Nordiques minor league affiliates
Vancouver Canucks minor league affiliates
Ice hockey clubs established in 1981
Ice hockey clubs disestablished in 1988
1981 establishments in New Brunswick
1988 disestablishments in New Brunswick